Sulliman is a surname. Notable people with the surname include:

Doug Sulliman (born 1959), Canadian ice hockey player
Hisham Sulliman (born 1978), Arab-Israeli actor
Easah Suliman (born 1998), Professional English Footballer

See also
Sulliman Mazadou (born 1985), French born Nigerian footballer 
Suleiman
Sullivan (disambiguation)